Morlanne is a commune in the Pyrénées-Atlantiques department in south-western France. Residents are referred to as the Morlannais.

See also
 Château de Morlanne
Communes of the Pyrénées-Atlantiques department

References

Communes of Pyrénées-Atlantiques